Petr Koblasa (born November 7, 1993) is a Czech professional ice hockey player. He is currently playing for HC Karlovy Vary of the Czech Extraliga.

Koblasa made his Czech Extraliga debut playing with HC Karlovy Vary during the 2011–12 Czech Extraliga season.

References

External links

1993 births
Living people
HC Baník Sokolov players
Czech ice hockey forwards
HC Karlovy Vary players
Piráti Chomutov players
Sportovní Klub Kadaň players
Sportspeople from Karlovy Vary